Jean Lempereur (born 28 December 1938) is a French footballer. He competed in the men's tournament at the 1968 Summer Olympics.

References

External links
 

1938 births
Living people
French footballers
Olympic footballers of France
Footballers at the 1968 Summer Olympics
People from Maubeuge
Association football defenders
Sportspeople from Nord (French department)
Mediterranean Games gold medalists for France
Mediterranean Games medalists in football
Competitors at the 1967 Mediterranean Games
Footballers from Hauts-de-France